Aloeides molomo, the molomo copper, is a butterfly of the family Lycaenidae. It is found in southern Africa.

The wingspan is 22–33 mm for males and 24–35 mm for females. Adults are on wing from August to December and from March to April. There are two generations per year.

The larvae of A. m. krooni feed on Sida ovata.

Subspecies
A. m. molomo (Eastern Cape, Free State, eastern Northern Cape, Gauteng, Mpumalanga, Limpopo, North West)
A. m. mumbuensis Riley, 1921 (Botswana, Zambia)
A. m. kiellandi Carcasson, 1961 (south-western Tanzania: Mpanda)
A. m. krooni Tite & Dickson, 1973 (northern Northern Cape to Namibia and Botswana)
A. m. coalescens Tite & Dickson, 1973 (Zimbabwe)
A. m. handmani Tite & Dickson, 1973 (Malawi)

References

Butterflies described in 1870
Aloeides
Butterflies of Africa
Taxa named by Roland Trimen